The 2018 Rugby Europe Women's Sevens Grand Prix Series was the 2018 edition of the annual rugby sevens competition for national women's teams in Rugby Europe. The top non-core teams will participate in a 2019 Hong Kong Women's Sevens for qualification into 2019-20 World Rugby Women's Sevens Series, and the bottom two will be relegated to the 2019 Trophy.

Schedule

Standings

Stage 1 (Marcoussis)

Pool Stage

Pool A

Pool B

Pool C

Knockout stage

Challenge Trophy

5th Place

Cup

Stage 2 (Kazan)

See also

 2019 Hong Kong Women's Sevens

References

External links
 Tournament page

 
2018
Sevens
2018 rugby sevens competitions
International women's rugby union competitions hosted by France
International women's rugby union competitions hosted by Russia
2018 in French women's sport
2018 in Russian women's sport
2018 in Russian rugby union
2018–19 in French rugby union